Tops' with Me is the debut album by British singer Helen Shapiro. It was released in 1962 and was her most successful album, reaching number 2 in the UK Albums Chart. She was accompanied by Martin Slavin and his Orchestra.

The album comprised cover versions of songs which had already been hit singles for other artists – "top pops" or simply "tops" in the slang of the day.

Track listing
Side One
"Little Devil" (Neil Sedaka, Howard Greenfield) - 2:27
"Will You Love Me Tomorrow" (Gerry Goffin, Carole King) - 3:19
"Because They're Young" (Aaron Schroeder, Don Costa, Wally Gold) 3:31
"The Day the Rains Came" (Gilbert Becaud. Pierre Delanoe) - 2:32
"Are You Lonesome Tonight" (Handman, Turk) - 2:45
"A Teenager in Love" (Doc Pomus, Mort Shuman) - 2:16

Side Two
"Lipstick on Your Collar" (Lewis, Goehring) - 2:16
"Beyond the Sea" (Charles Trenet, Jack Lawrence) - 3:26
"Sweet Nothin's" (Ronnie Self) - 2:36
"You Mean Ev'rything to Me" (Neil Sedaka, Howard Greenfield) - 2:34
"I Love You" (Bruce Welch) - 2:13
"You Got What It Takes" (Gordy, Davis) - 2:43

References

1962 debut albums
EMI Columbia Records albums
Covers albums